The Wisconsin Bridge and Iron Company (WB&I) was a fabricator and erector of iron and steel bridges and other large structures.

According to one source it was founded in Milwaukee, Wisconsin in 1888.  According to another source, the firm was founded by three brothers in Wauwatosa, Wisconsin in 1870 as Weinhagen Brothers, Engineers, which in 1880 became known as the Wisconsin Bridge and Iron Company, and was incorporated in 1891 using that name.  The 1887 Turtleville bridge was believed to be one of the earlier truss bridges constructed by the firm.

The Riemer family of Elm Grove, Wisconsin was heavily affiliated with the company until it was sold in the 1970s.  A competitor to American Bridge Company, (in at least one case both firms submitted bids that matched to the penny), this firm was responsible for many bridges and other large structures in the United States Midwest and elsewhere. The Historic American Engineering Record shows at least 16 projects where WB&I were believed to be either the prime, steel or fabrication contractors.

A number of the firm's works are listed on the U.S. National Register of Historic Places (NRHP).

Selected works
Not meant as an exhaustive list, here are a few projects that WB&I is known to have participated in:
Heath M. Robinson Memorial Cut River Bridge - US-2, Michigan - 1947
Green Bay Road Bridge - Manitowoc Rapids, Wisconsin - 1887
Turtleville Iron Bridge (1887), near Beloit, Wisconsin, a Pratt truss bridge, NRHP-listed
Ashfork-Bainbridge Steel Dam- Arizona - 1898
Redridge Steel Dam - Michigan - 1901
Hauser Dam - 1907
Brownsville & Matamoros International Bridge - Texas - 1908
MacArthur Bridge - Iowa/Illinois - 1917
Ironton-Russell Bridge - Ironton, Ohio - 1922 
U.S. Rt. 90 Pearl River Bridge - Mississippi / Louisiana - 1933
Jefferson Street Viaduct (1936), over Des Moines River, Ottumwa, Iowa, NRHP-listed
Hutsonville Bridge - Indiana - 1939
 Aloha Stadium - Hawaii
 Lincoln Center movable stage.
 Shirley Railroad Bridge - Arkansas - 1908, NRHP-listed as Middle Fork of the Little Red River Bridge, Co. Rd. 125 over the Middle Fork of the Little Red River Shirley, Arkansas
Seventh Street-Black River Bridge, Seventh St. over Black R. Port Huron, Michigan, NRHP-listed 
St. Francis River Bridge, US 70, over the St. Francis River Madison, Arkansas, NRHP-listed
Waverly Bridge, spans Tombigbee River between Waverly & Columbus, Mississippi, NRHP-listed

Notes

Bridge companies
Companies based in Milwaukee
Engineering companies of the United States
1888 establishments in Wisconsin
Construction and civil engineering companies established in 1888
American companies established in 1888
Manufacturing companies established in 1888
Manufacturing companies based in Wisconsin